Cesar E. Chavez High School is a continuation school in Santa Ana, California.  In 2004, the school was granted a six-year accreditation by the Western Association of Schools and Colleges (WASC).

In 2005 the school was selected a model continuation School by State Superintendent of Public Instruction Jack O’Connell among other schools.

References

High schools in Santa Ana, California
Continuation high schools in California
Public high schools in California
1994 establishments in California